José Luis Giménez-Frontín (1943–2008) was a Spanish writer.

Works

Poetry 
 La Sagrada Familia y otros poemas, B., Lumen, 1972. 
 Amor Omnia y otros poemas, B., Ambito, 1976. 
 Las voces de Laye, M., Hiperión, 1981. (Premio Ciudad de Barcelona)
 El largo adiós, B., Taifa, 1985. 
 Que no muera ese instante, B., Lumen, 1993. 
 Astrolabio (Antología 1972-1988). 1999.
 El ensayo del organista. 1999
 Zona Cero. 2003
 La ruta de Occitania. Poesía reunida (1972-2006), Igitur, 2006.
 Requiem de las esferas. 2006 
 Tres elegías, La Torre degli Arabeschi, 2007.

Memoirs 
 Costa Brava, 1976.
 Woodstock Road en julio. Notas y diario (1996).
 Los años contados (2008).

Narrative 
 Un día de campo. 1974
 El idiota enamorado. 1982
 El carro del heno. 1987 
 Justos y benéficos. 1988 
 Señorear la tierra. 1991. 
 La otra casa. 1997 
 Cordelia. 2000

Essays 
 Movimientos literarios de vanguardia. 1974 
 6 ensayos heterodoxos. 1976
 El Surrealismo. 1978 
 Camilo José Cela. Texto y contexto. 1985
 Teatre-Museu Dalí. versión íntegra. 1994, 2000
 Visiones del Quijote, "De la pedagogía al signo". 2005.

1943 births
2008 deaths
English–Spanish translators
Spanish literary critics
Spanish art critics
Spanish children's writers
20th-century translators